Laughtivism (a portmanteau of laughter+ activism) is strategic use of humor and mocking 
by social nonviolent movements in order to undermine the authority of 
an opponent, build credibility, break fear and apathy and reach target audiences. It has been defined, and predominantly practiced independently by two activist groups  - The Center for Applied Nonviolent Actions and Strategies (CANVAS)  based in Belgrade, Serbia (Executive Director Srđa Popović) as well as the New York-based team the Yes Men Some recent examples of Laughtivism include: The Yes Men creating a false movie production company comparing  the Midwestern Tar Sands area to Mordor, and Egyptian comedian Bassem Youssef's satirical television show The B+ which made fun of events during the Egyptian Revolution in 2011.

For more examples of Laughtivism see "Why Dictators Don't Like Jokes", by Srdja Popovic and Mladen Joksic. For a critical view of Laughtivism see "Two Cheers for Laughtivism", by Kei Hiruta.

See also
Otpor!
Bringing Down a Dictator 
Albert Einstein Institution

References

External links
Canvasopedia.org 
Theyesmen.org
Everydayrebellion.com
www.beautifultrouble.org
"Revolution U"
"The Revolutionist"

Laughter
Activism by type